A window of opportunity (also called a margin of opportunity or critical window) is a period of time during which some action can be taken that will achieve a desired outcome. Once this period is over, or the "window is closed", the specified outcome is no longer possible.

Examples
Examples of windows of opportunity include:
The critical period in neurological development, during which neuroplasticity is greatest and key functions, such as imprinting and language, are acquired which may be impossible to acquire at a later stage
The golden hour or golden time, used in emergency medicine to describe the period following traumatic injury in which life-saving treatment is likely to be successful
Market opportunities, in which one may be positioned to take advantage of a gap in a particular market, the timing of which may depend on the activities of customers, competitors, and other market context factors
Planting and harvesting seasons, in agriculture, which are generally timed to maximize crop yields
Space launch and maneuver windows, which are determined by orbital dynamics and mission goals and constrained by fuel/delta-v budgets
The theorized tipping point in climatology, after which the Earth's climate is predicted to shift to a new stable equilibrium
Various transient astronomical events, which present limited (and often unpredictable) windows for observation

Characteristics

Timing
The timing and length of a critical window may be well known and predictable (as in planetary transits) or more poorly understood (in the case of medical emergencies or climate change). In some cases, there may be multiple windows during which a goal can be achieved, as in the case of space launch windows.

Costs
In some time-critical situations, failure to act may entail a continuously increasing cost over time, or a continuously decreasing probability over time of achieving the desired outcome. In real-time computing systems, this may be represented by time-utility functions.

Automation
In situations with very brief or unpredictable windows of opportunity, automation may be employed to take advantage of these windows, as in algorithmic trading and time-domain astronomy. Real-time computing systems can guarantee responses on the order of milliseconds or less.

Artificial windows of opportunity
Critical windows for making purchases may be artificially imposed (or even falsely implied) as a marketing tactic to encourage action, in what is known as a "limited time offer".

See also
Planning
Automated planning and scheduling, in artificial intelligence
Point of no return
Response time
Target of opportunity, in combat
Time limit

References

Time
Causes of events
Intention
Planning
Business terms
Broad-concept articles
Emergency medicine
Developmental biology
Spaceflight concepts
Real-time computing
Climatology
Observational astronomy